Cosimo Daddi (before 1575–1630), was a late Renaissance painter active mainly around Volterra and Florence. In 1591–94, he participated in the fresco decoration (the deeds of Godefroy de Bouillon) of the Villa Petraia for the Medici family. Baldassare Franceschini was one of his pupils.

References
Pontormo and Rosso. Empoli and Volterra. David Franklin. The Burlington Magazine, Vol. 137, No. 1102 (Jan., 1995), pp. 48–50

16th-century births
1630 deaths
16th-century Italian painters
Italian male painters
17th-century Italian painters
Painters from Tuscany
Italian Renaissance painters
People from Volterra
Year of birth uncertain